KQLF is a Christian radio station licensed to Ottumwa, Iowa, broadcasting on 88.3 MHz FM.  KQLF is owned by Sound In Spirit Broadcasting, Inc.

KQLF's programming includes Christian music and Christian talk and teaching shows such as Revive Our Hearts with Nancy Leigh DeMoss, Focus on the Family, Turning Point with David Jeremiah, In Touch with Charles Stanley, Insight for Living with Chuck Swindoll, Love Worth Finding with Adrian Rogers, and Unshackled!.

Translators
KQLF is also heard in Fairfield, Iowa through a translator at 102.3 FM.

References

External links
KQLF's official website

QLF